The 2022 ACCR Formula 4 Trophy was a motor racing series held in the Central and Eastern Europe, competed over four rounds. The full six rounds schedule was supposed to be the first season of the ACCR Formula 4 Championship organized by the Automobile Club of the Czech Republic (ACCR). The season was supposed to start with its first round taking place at the Hungaroring in April and with the final round taking place at Brno Circuit in September. After many calendar changes caused by massive delivery delays, it was announced on 6 July that the start of the championship as an FIA Formula 4 Championship would be postponed to 2023 and that only the last three original rounds would be held as a trophy series. The series uses Tatuus F4-T-421 chassis primarily, although Tatuus F4-T014 was eligible for the Trophy class.

The ACCR Formula 4 races were held as a sub-class of the Formula Libre category in the ESET V4 Cup package.

Teams and drivers

Calendar 
The series joining ESET V4 Cup package on its six round schedule was announced on 2 December 2021. On 30 March 2022, the round at the Hungaroring was cancelled, with Monza being added to the schedule as the final venue of the season. On 13 April 2022, the round scheduled for 24–26 June at Tor Poznań was replaced by the round at Vallelunga Circuit on 8–10 July. On 6 July 2022, the status of the series changed and subsequently all the planned rounds supporting Formula X Racing Weekend were cancelled.

Race results

Trophy standings 
Points were awarded to the top 10 classified finishers in each race. No points were awarded for pole position or fastest lap. Half points were awarded if no more than three drivers participated in the first race of a competition. Despite being hold as a non-championship round, the results from the competition at Red Bull Ring were used in the final classification.

Notes

References

External links 

 

ACCR
ACCR
ACCR
ACCR
ACCR Formula 4 Championship
ACCR F4